The Wright R-1820 Cyclone 9 is an American radial engine developed by Curtiss-Wright, widely used on aircraft in the 1930s through 1950s.  It was produced under license in France as the Hispano-Suiza 9V or Hispano-Wright 9V, and in the Soviet Union as the Shvetsov M-25.

Design and development
The R-1820 Cyclone 9 represented a further development of the Wright P-2 engine dating back to 1925. Featuring a greater displacement and a host of improvements, the R-1820 entered production in 1931. The engine remained in production well into the 1950s.

The R-1820 was built under license by Lycoming, Pratt & Whitney Canada, and also, during World War II, by the Studebaker Corporation. The Soviet Union had purchased a license for the design, and the Shvetsov OKB was formed to metricate the American specification powerplant for Soviet government-factory production as the M-25, with the R-1820's general design features used by the Shvetsov design bureau for many of their future radials for the Soviet air forces through the 1940s and onwards. In Spain the R-1820 was license-built as the Hispano-Suiza 9V or Hispano-Wright 9V.

The R-1820 was at the heart of many famous aircraft including early Douglas airliners (the prototype DC-1, the DC-2, the first civil versions of the DC-3, and the limited-production DC-5), every wartime example of the Boeing B-17 Flying Fortress and Douglas SBD Dauntless bombers, the early versions of the Polikarpov I-16 fighter (as the M-25), and the Piasecki H-21 helicopter.

The R-1820 also found limited use in armoured vehicles. The G-200 variant developed  at 2,300 rpm and powered the strictly experimental M6 Heavy Tank.

D-200 Diesel
The Wright R-1820 was converted to a diesel during World War II by Caterpillar Inc. as the D-200 and produced  at 2,000 rpm in the M4A6 Sherman.

Variants

Notes: Unit numbers ending with W indicate engine variants fitted with water-methanol emergency power boost systems.

Hispano-Suiza 9V
The Hispano-Suiza 9V is a licence-built version of the R-1820. 
Hispano-Suiza 9Vr9V with reduction gear
Hispano-Suiza 9Vb
Hispano-Suiza 9Vbrvariant of the 9Vb with reduction gear
Hispano-Suiza 9Vbrsvariant of the 9Vb with reduction gear and supercharger
Hispano-Suiza 9Vbsvariant of the 9Vb with supercharger
Hispano-Suiza 9Vdvariant of the 9V
Hispano-Suiza 9V-10 driving fixed-pitch propeller
Hispano-Suiza 9V-11as -10 but RH rotation
Hispano-Suiza 9V-16 driving variable-pitch propeller, LH rotation
Hispano-Suiza 9V-17as -16 but RH rotation

Applications

Vehicles
 M4A6 tank
 M6 heavy tank

Engines on display
Preserved Wright R-1820 engines are on display at the following museums:
 American Airlines C.R. Smith Museum
 Fleet Air Arm Museum
 Delta Flight Museum
 National Air and Space Museum
 National Museum of the U.S. Air Force

Specifications (GR-1820-G2)

See also

References

Bibliography

 Bridgman, L, (ed.) (1998) Jane's Fighting Aircraft of World War II. Crescent. .
 Eden, Paul & Soph Moeng, The Complete Encyclopedia of World Aircraft. Amber Books Ltd. Bradley's Close, 74-77 White Lion Street, London, NI 9PF, 2002, .
Gunston, Bill. World Encyclopedia of Aero Engines: From the Pioneers to the Present Day. 5th edition, Stroud, UK: Sutton, 2006.
White, Graham. Allied Aircraft Piston Engines of World War II: History and Development of Frontline Aircraft Piston Engines Produced by Great Britain and the United States During World War II. Warrendale, Pennsylvania: SAE International, 1995.  
 
 

Aircraft air-cooled radial piston engines
R-1820
1930s aircraft piston engines